Almsee, English sometimes Lake Alm, is a lake in Upper Austria's part of the Salzkammergut in the Almtal valley,  south of the village of Grünau im Almtal.

The lake drains through the Alm River. Since 1965, the area around the Almsee is under nature conservation. Konrad Lorenz made important observations of the greylag goose at the lake.

References 

	

Lakes of Upper Austria
Totes Gebirge